Online disinhibition effect is the lack of restraint one feels when communicating online in comparison to communicating in-person. People feel safer saying things online which they would not say in real life because they have the ability to remain completely anonymous and invisible behind the computer screen. Apart from anonymity, other factors such as asynchronous communication, empathy deficit, or individual personality and cultural factors also contribute to online disinhibition. The manifestations of such an effect could be in both positive and negative directions. Thus online disinhibition could be classified as either benign disinhibition or toxic disinhibition.

Classifications 
Benign online disinhibition describes a situation in which people get some benefit from the absence of restraint in cyberspace. One example of benign online disinhibition can be seen as self-disclosure. With the help of Internet anonymity, people could share personal feelings or disclose themselves in the way they are reluctant to do in real life. For instance, young people feel relieved when revealing untold secrets or personally embarrassing details in online chats. Such self-disclosures enable people to establish an intimate interpersonal relationship sooner and stronger when compared with real life face to face communication. The online disinhibition effect also provides chances to express themselves for people who are unwilling to communicate in the real world, like people who are introverted, shy, socially phobic and individuals with a stutter or impaired hearing.

Another type of online disinhibition is called toxic disinhibition, which represents an increased tendency towards online flaming and inappropriate behaviors. These often contain hostile language, swearing, and even threats. This norm describes the negative side effect of the loss of inhibition on the cyberspace. The antisocial behaviors caused by toxic disinhibition not only occur in multiple online platforms like blogs, hate sites, and comment sections, but also exist in diverse forms which include cyberbullying, social loafing and more.

However, the distinction between benign and toxic online disinhibition is not always clear. For example, a hostile word in the online chat may damage other's self-image, but on the other hand, if the word is genuine, perhaps it may help the person on the receiving end have a better understanding of themselves. Considering the different subcultures of online communities, people may have various tolerance towards a particular social behavior. Another example would be acting as a bystander of online hate. A German study looked at the association between seeing online hate and creating online hate on teenagers. This study found a positive correlation between online hate and creating online hate among teenagers.

Influencing factors 
Anonymity, asynchronous communication, and empathy deficit contribute to online disinhibition. Anonymity can make a person feel safe online, like a different person; one might even take on a new persona. It can also make one feel like doing or saying anything is possible because one will most likely not be reprimanded in real life. However, new technologies employed and coming into force by law enforcement partners are increasingly making it easier to combat cybercrime. Asynchronous communication is communication that is not happening live and it can take time for the original message to receive a response. Asynchronous communication affects online disinhibition because one can send a message out into the internet and not get an immediate reply, and log out. Therefore, one doesn't have to think about what is said. On the other hand, this also gives one time to give a more thoughtful response. Empathy deficit is the reduction of being able to identify with others' emotions. There is an empathy deficit because of lack of non-verbal feedback. Through mediated communication it is hard to know what tone and facial expressions accompany the message. So, it makes it harder to empathize with others. Both anonymity and empathy deficit make it harder to perceive others online as people with feelings because of the lack of facial interaction.

Several researchers have noted the correlation between Pathological Internet Use and increased online disinhibition, especially among college students. An Australian study found that disinhibition, which is often a predictor of other addictive behaviors, was a poor predictor of heavy Internet use. The joint prevalence of low self-esteem and online disinhibition among pathological internet users suggests that they may find the anonymity and a synchronicity of online interactions liberating, leading to greater disinhibition when they are online.

Possible consequences
Online disinhibition plays a role in the act of cyberbullying. Cyberbullying is the act of trying to make another person feel embarrassed, intimidated, or bad about themselves through the Internet. Anonymity usually leads to meaner comments towards others (cyberbullying) but it alone doesn't cause cyberbullying. Asynchronous communication allows the bully to say what they have to say and then log out like nothing happened, having to face no consequence outside of the Internet. Empathy deficit is what allows the bully to post the messages in the first place, the victim is reduced to a name on a computer screen.

Racist, sexist, violent, and rude online comments aren't the direct result of anonymity. Those comments arise only when other people are also saying things like that; online users tend to keep the same tone, civility/incivility as others in online posts.

The online disinhibition effect can have an effect on one's job security and future employment opportunities. Sixteen-year-old Kimberley Swann was fired from her job due to negative comments she made about her occupation on her Facebook page, while another infamous case involved a woman, Heather Armstrong, being terminated after "lampooning" her colleagues on the Internet. These are consequences of certain Internet users believing themselves to be unchained from typical social standards. The author of "Six Causes of Online Disinhibition" states that "[c]ompared with face-to-face interactions, online we feel freer to do and say what we want and, as a result, often do and say things we shouldn't".

Online disinhibition can also have positive outcomes. People that are shy, that feel they can't talk about certain things in their real lives, that may have no vocal outlet can benefit from online disinhibition without causing harm to others. The anonymity of being online allows people to self-disclose more than they do in-person.
Online disinhibition can provide a safe place for people of the LGBTQ community (and other marginalized groups) to share information and support one another. It can help students be more interactive in online classrooms than they are in offline classrooms.

See also
 Antisocial personality disorder
 Cyberpsychology
Deindividuation
 Flaming (Internet)
 Internet troll
 Ring of Gyges
 The Invisible Man

References

Further reading

External links
 
 The Online Disinhibition Effect Rider University
 

Internet culture
Internet trolling
Cyberpsychology
Anonymity
Psychological effects